Looker is a 1981 American science-fiction film written and directed by Michael Crichton.

Looker or Lookers may also refer to:

Music
 "Looker", the theme song to the movie Looker performed by Sue Saad
 "Looker", a song by Kim Carnes from the 1981 album Voyeur
 "Lookers", a song by American rock band The Menzingers from the 2017 album After the Party

Other uses
 Looker (character), a character in the DC Universe
 Looker (company), an American business intelligence software company
 Looker (surname)
 A character in the Pokémon universe
 Lookers, a car dealership chain in the United Kingdom and Ireland